Durushkhela  درشخیلہ  is an administrative unit, known as Union council, of Swat District in the Khyber Pakhtunkhwa province of Pakistan.درشخیلہ گاوں مینگورہ سے 27 کلومیٹر کے فاصلے پر واقع ہے اور مٹہ سے 9 کلو میٹر کے فاصلے پر باغڈھیری روڈ پر واقع ہے گاوں کے شمال کے طرف سرسبز باغات ہے مغرب کے طرف سرسبز باغات اور خوبصورت پہاڑ ہے اور جنوب کے طرف سرسبز باغات اور گاوں کوزہ درشخیلہ واقع ہے اور مشرق کے طرف دریا سوات ہے جو کہ بلکل گاوں سے لگا ہو ا ہے  درشخیلہ یونین کونسل تحصیل مٹہ ضلع سوات آبادی : 15000 ٹوٹل رقبہ  28707 پہاڑی زمین 12081 کنال بارانی زمین : 9094 آب پاشی زمین 7633 کنال گیارہ مرلے ٹانگ 1400 کنال قوم قبیلے یوسفزئی ، سادات ،ملیان،گوجر ، کوہستانی  فصلیں اور میوہ جات : گندم ، مکئی،چاول،سیب ،آڑو ،املوک،ناشپاتی،آخروٹ،سٹابری،انجیر،چیری،الوچہ،خرمانی،پیاز،لہسن ، سرکاری اداری گورنمنٹ ہائی سکول ، دفتر زراعت،بینک،ٹیلیفون اکسچینج،ڈاکخانہ،پٹوارخانہ،گرلز ہائی سکول،ہسپتال ، واپڈا کمپلینٹ آفس

See also 

 Swat District

References

External links
Khyber-Pakhtunkhwa Government website section on Lower Dir
United Nations
Hajjinfo.org Uploads
 PBS paiman.jsi.com

Swat District
Populated places in Swat District
Union councils of Khyber Pakhtunkhwa
Union Councils of Swat District